Complete Singles Collection or Complete Single Collection may refer to:

 Complete Singles Collection (Anti-Nowhere League album), 1995
The Complete Singles Collection 1994–2000, a 2002 album by The Unseen
 Complete Single Collection '97–'08, a 2008 album by The Brilliant Green
Complete Single Collection, an album by Cute